Oriola Marashi (born 18 March 1996), is an Albanian model and vocalist. She is one of the faces of Guess.

Career 
Marashi got her breakout role at a young age. She is described by Telegrafi as having a "perfect shape", and as being "one of Albania's most attractive women". She is also known for posting sultry pictures on her social media. She is a model for American clothing brand Guess, covering billboards and walking runways for the aforementioned brand; and working closely with American designer Paul Marciano. She has also worked with Givenchy, Dolce & Gabbana and has being a cover model for Vogue in the past. She has worked in Milan, Venice, Paris, Marrakech and Dubai. In an interview with Dosja, her mother revealed that she invited to be a contestant on Big Brother VIP in 2021. In 2022, she was an attendee at the amFAR gala in Venice, which was also the 76th Venice International Film Festival She also appeared as a video vixen in Jonas Blue's song titled Mama featuring Australian singer William Singe.

Personal life 
Marashi is from Tirana. She has a sister who is also a model. She dresses as a nun for halloween. She has been in relationships with Albanian football player, Eros Grezda and Big Brother Albania winner, Anaid Kaloti.

References 

1996 births
Living people
Models from Tirana
Albanian female models
Albanian pop musicians
Albanian-language singers
21st-century Albanian women singers
21st-century Albanian models